Gbanti Kamaranka is a chiefdom of Bombali District in the Northern Province of Sierra Leone. The principal town lies at Kamaranka.

As of 2004 the chiefdom has a population of 26,126.

References

Chiefdoms of Sierra Leone
Northern Province, Sierra Leone